Libertaire-Plage was a libertarian (anarchist) summer camp in Châtelaillon-Plage, southwest France, based around Albert Libertad and L'Anarchie in the early 1900s.

Further reading 

 Renaud Violet, Régénération humaine et éducation libertaire. L’influence du néo-malthusianisme français sur les expériences pédagogiques libertaires avant 1914., Marc Bloch University (M.A.), octobre 2002.
 
 Michel Antony, VII. Essais utopiques libertaires de petite dimension. L'extrême variété des microcosmes libertaires, alternatifs et autogestionnaires.

Anarchist communities